Kelly Meggs (born January 15, 1969) is an American militiaman and alt-right activist serving as the leader of the Oath Keepers' Florida chapter.

He was found guilty of seditious conspiracy following his forced entry into the United States Capitol during the January 6 United States Capitol attack.

Oath Keepers activities 
Meggs is a member of the alt-right and anti-government Oath Keepers organization and the leader of its Florida chapter. 

Meggs entered the United States Capitol during the January 6, 2021 attack. The US government alleges that he led the "infamous 'stack' formation of Oath Keepers inside the Capitol".

US authorities alleged what Meggs said on his own Facebook page: that prior to the riot, he was discussing a partnership with the Proud Boys and the antigovernment organisation the Three Percenters.

Meggs was arrested on February 17, 2021 and held in Grady County, Oklahoma before being transferred to Washington D.C. for his trial. In a court case that included Stewart Rhodes, Meggs was found guilty of seditious conspiracy and "conspiracy to prevent an officer from discharging their official duties" on November 29, 2022. Their conviction was the first time the seditious conspiracy legislation had been used to prosecute anyone since 1995.

Personal life 
Prior to his incarceration, Meggs lived in Dunnellon with his wife, Connie Meggs, who was also arrested.

Kelly Meggs was aged 53 years in November 2022.

References 

Living people
1969 births
Convicted participants in the January 6 United States Capitol attack
Members of the Oath Keepers
People convicted of sedition
People from Dunnellon, Florida